Proteuxoa porphyrescens is a moth of the family Noctuidae. It is found in the Australian Capital Territory, New South Wales, Queensland, Tasmania and Victoria.

External links
Australian Faunal Directory

Moths of Australia
Proteuxoa
Moths described in 1902
Taxa named by Oswald Bertram Lower